Fort Metal Cross, originally Fort Dixcove, is a military structure located on a promontory at the fishing community of Infuma in Dixcove, in the Western Region of Ghana. Because of its history in the Atlantic slave trade and its testimony to European-African trade, the Fort was included as one of the Forts and Castles of Volta, Greater Accra, Central and Western Regions that became a World Heritage Site in 1979.

History 
Fort Metal Cross was besieged twice in 1712 by John Kanu, a local ally of the Prussians, but the fort was defended successfully.

The fort was transferred to the Dutch as part of a large trade of forts between Britain and the Netherlands in 1868 under the Anglo-Dutch Gold Coast Treaty. It was renamed Fort Metalen Kruis. Four years later, however, on 6 April 1872, the fort was, with the entire Dutch Gold Coast, again transferred to the United Kingdom, as per the Gold Coast treaty of 1871. The Dutch name stuck, however, translated as Fort Metal Cross. It was known as ‘the fake mint of the Gold Coast’ by author Bosman because the gold that was mined was mostly impure gold. This led to the promise of gold never happened. The fort was a service station for the supply of timber from nearby forest and repairing of ships. It was also used as a slave prison during the slave trade. The British and Dutch had a fort exchange agreement in 1867 and the Dutch became the owners of the fort. The Dutch later sold their forts to the British.

Current 
The fort has been both a Police Station and a Postal station. It has been leased to a private institution.

Gallery

References

Buildings and structures completed in 1683
History of Ghana
Castles in Ghana
Dutch Gold Coast
1683 establishments in the British Empire
African slave trade
Metal Cross
M
Ahanta West Municipal District